Ase He Kanyadan is an Indian Marathi language television series which aired on Zee Marathi. The story deals with the father-daughter relationship. The series premiered from 24 January 2015 by replacing Jawai Vikat Ghene Aahe.

Cast 
 Sharad Ponkshe as Sadashiv Kirtane
 Madhura Deshpande as Gayatri Sadashiv Kirtane
 Prasad Jawade as Kartik
 Sulekha Talwalkar
 Avinash Narkar
 Uday Sabnis
 Radha Sagar
 Ninad Limaye

References

External links 
 Ase He Kanyadan at ZEE5
 

Marathi-language television shows
Zee Marathi original programming
2015 Indian television series debuts
2015 Indian television series endings